SG Rot-Weiss Frankfurt 01 is a German association football club from Frankfurt am Main. The association was founded on 11 November 1901 as FV Amicitia 1901 Bockenheim in what is today the city district of Bockenheim.

History

Early years
The Frankfurt side played under a number of different names in the decades before World War II. They were known as Frankfurter FV Amicitia from 1909 to 1919, then playing as VfR 1901 Frankfurt after World War I until 1926, playing in the Kreisliga Nordmain. Between 1926 and 1935 they were called SC Rot Weiß Frankfurt and played mostly in the Bezirksliga Main-Hessen. The team enjoyed some success in the early 30s, advancing to the finals of the Southern German championship in 1930 and 1931.

In 1933, German football was re-organized into sixteen top-flight divisions and Rot-Weiß appeared in the Gauliga Südwest for three seasons between 1938 and 1941. In 1941, the division was split into the Gauliga Westmark and the Gauliga Hessen-Nassau where the club played another three years as Reichsbahn TSV Rot-Weiß Frankfurt. Their best result was a divisional vice-championship in '41.

Postwar
After the war occupying Allied authorities ordered the dissolution of all organizations in Germany, including sports and football associations. In late 1945 the club was re-constituted as SG Bockenheim and in 1947, once again named Rot-Weiß, played a single season in the first division Oberliga Süd before being relegated. The club set an attendance record that still stands to this day when they played 1. FC Nürnberg before 27,000 fans.

Rot-Weiß competed as a third-tier side in the Amateurliga Hessen through most of the 60s and 70s with a single season cameo in the Regionalliga Süd (II) in 1968–69. The club then slipped to the Landesliga Hessen-Süd in 1979 where they played for five of the next seven seasons. From the late 80s to the mid-90s they were once again a third division side and captured the Oberliga Hessen championship in 1990. Participation in the subsequent promotion round for the 2. Bundesliga ended in failure. Under mounting financial pressure the team's performance slipped and by the mid-90s they were playing fourth and fifth division football. Rot-Weiß played in the Hessenliga (V) again from 2007 to 2012, before being relegated, and the primary focus of the club has shifted to its youth sides. A runners-up finish in the Verbandsliga in 2014–15 qualified the club for the promotion round to the Hessenliga where it overcame Hünfelder SV and Viktoria Kelsterbach to win promotion.

Honours
The club's honours:

League
 Nordkreis-Liga (I)
 Champions: 1918
 Hessenliga (II/III)
 Champions: 1947, 1968, 1990
 Runners-up: 1991, 2016
 Landesliga Hessen-Süd (IV)
 Champions: 1966, 1983, 1986
 Runners-up: 2002, 2006, 2007
 Verbandsliga Hessen-Süd (VI)
 Runners-up: 2015

Cup
 Hesse Cup (Tiers III-VII)
 Winners: 1971, 1974, 1989, 1992
 Runners-up: 1946, 1994

Recent managers
Recent managers of the club:

Recent seasons
The recent season-by-season performance of the club:

 With the introduction of the Regionalligas in 1994 and the 3. Liga in 2008 as the new third tier, below the 2. Bundesliga, all leagues below dropped one tier. Also in 2008, a large number of football leagues in Hesse were renamed, with the Oberliga Hessen becoming the Hessenliga, the Landesliga becoming the Verbandsliga, the Bezirksoberliga becoming the Gruppenliga and the Bezirksliga becoming the Kreisoberliga.

Stadium
The club plays its home matches in the Stadion am Brentanobad (capacity 6,000) built in 1940 and re-furbished in 1998. It is also used by women's club 1. FFC Frankfurt.

References

External links

 Official team site
 Abseits Guide to German Soccer
 Rot-Weiss Frankfurt at Weltfussball.de 
 Das deutsche Fußball-Archiv  historical German domestic league tables

 
Football clubs in Germany
Football clubs in Frankfurt
Association football clubs established in 1901
1901 establishments in Germany